Likuyufusi is a village in  the Ruvuma Region of Southwestern Tanzania. It is located along the A19 road, to the east of  Sinai Village and west of Lilambo.

References

Populated places in Ruvuma Region